Ankycorbin is an ankyrin repeat and coiled-coil domain containing protein that in humans is encoded by the RAI14 gene. It is expressed in a variety of human tissues and is thought to play a role in actin regulation of ectoplasmic specialization, establishment of sperm polarity and sperm adhesion. It may also promote the integrity of Sertoli cell tight junctions at the blood testis barrier.

Gene

Location 
RAI14 contains 15 exons and is located on the plus strand of chromosome number 5 at position 5p13.2. It spans 5,068 base pairs from position 34,656,328 to 34,832,612.

Gene Neighborhood 
Genes TTC23L and LOC105374721 neighbor RAI14 on chromosome 5.

Expression 
RAI14 is expressed within a wide range of human tissues. Some areas of the highest expression by TPM (transcripts per million) include tissues of the endometrium, smooth muscle, cervix, cervix, testis, and spleen. Within the human brain, RAI14 expression is abundant in the area around the brain stem and medulla. The highest expression levels came from the myelencephalon, a region of the embryonic brain that would later become the medulla oblongata.

Homology

Paralogs 
RAI14 does not have any paralogs.

Orthologs 
Most of the entire sequence of the ankycorbin protein is well conserved between the majority of mammals and vertebrates. More distantly related orthologs, such as sharks, begin to lose similarity and become less conserved in the C-terminus end of the protein. Ankycorbin is not well conserved within invertebrates, such as coral, at all. The latter half of the protein is largely missing and the only portion that retains some semblance of conservation is the area near the N-terminus that is associated with the ankyrin repeat domain.

Protein

Transcripts 
Ankycorbin has four different isoforms (A, B, C, and D) with most isoforms containing one or more splice variants that mainly differ in the 5' UTR. Isoform D is the longest known isoform at 983 amino acids in length, however isoform A (980 amino acids) is the most predominant form of the protein.

General Properties 
The RAI14 protein has a predicted weight of 110.0 kDal and an isoelectric point of 5.87. It's also predicted to have glutamine rich region between nucleotides 914-978 and is otherwise rich in lycine, glutamate, and serine while being poor in glycine and phenylalanine. It is a soluble protein.

Structure and Domains 
Ankycorbin contains an ankyrin repeat region located near the N-terminus that consists of 6 ankyrin repeats. The protein is predominantly composed of alpha helices and coiled-coil domains with no predicted beta-sheet structures.

Post Translational Modifications 
RAI14 is a highly phosphorylated protein with hundreds of predicted phosphorylation sites. It is predicted to be a nuclear protein and contains 3 nuclear localization signals.

Function 
RAI14 is predicted to play a role in cell-cell adhesion sites, particularly the cell-cell interactions of Sertoli cells from within the testis. Sertoli cells are involved in the creation of the blood testis barrier and provides a specialized, protected environment within the seminiferous tubules of the testis for germ cell development.

References